"Shelter Skelter" is the second segment of the thirty-third episode and the ninth episode of the second season (1986–87) of the television series The Twilight Zone. The segment follows two men living in a fallout shelter following a nuclear explosion.

Plot
Harry Dobbs has built a fallout shelter in his basement for himself and his family and is training them in postwar survival. He mandates that his family not tell anyone else about the shelter. However, after his wife Sally leaves to visit her sister in Kansas City, taking their two children with her, Harry gets drunk and tells Nick, who works at Harry's gun store, about the shelter. Harry confesses he is looking forward to the inevitable nuclear war so the world will be rid of moral degenerates and he and his family can start over "in a purified world". Harry shows Nick the fallout shelter's communications, which include a hydraulic system that can raise and lower an antenna through tons of rubble, so he could communicate with other survivors after a nuclear attack.

Harry raises the antenna while turning on the TV. On the news, the U.S. military is on red alert. Harry calls Sally to come home. She refuses, saying that Harry cries wolf too often. A massive explosion occurs as Harry runs back to the shelter with Nick and shuts the door. The blast destroys the raised antenna, cutting off all contact with the outside. The radiation monitor is nearly at maximum, and Harry warns Nick that they cannot emerge until the radiation has died down.

Six weeks later, Nick hears people moving above and calls to them. Harry silences him, pointing out that the radiation is still high, meaning whoever is out there must be scavengers. After ten months, the radiation has not gone down and the generator has long since exhausted its power supply, leaving only candles and the red warning lamp for light. Stir crazy, Nick leaves the shelter. He returns and implores Harry to let him back in, saying the town has been reduced to rubble, there is no daylight, and it is freezing (the hypothesized symptoms of a nuclear winter). Harry refuses; since Nick is now contaminated, letting him back in will only cause both of them to suffer lingering deaths. With no one to talk to, Harry buries himself in survival prep.

On the surface, it is revealed that the explosion was a Broken Arrow incident in which a bomb detonated at the local air force base, destroying the town. The accident shocked the world from the brink of war. The blast crater is contained under a radiation proof dome - "The Peace Dome" - which serves as a memorial. Sally kept quiet about Harry being in the fallout shelter so that the children would no longer be exposed to his obsessive survivalism.

External links
 

1987 American television episodes
The Twilight Zone (1985 TV series season 2) episodes
Survivalism in culture

fr:Sans abri (La Cinquième Dimension)